Live! Final Attack at Budokan is the 2nd live album by the Japanese heavy metal band The Sex Machineguns. It was released on September 26, 2003, in Japan only. As the title suggests, it was recorded at the world-famous Nippon Budokan arena in Tokyo, Japan. The album is a two disc collection of songs from their first 4 studio albums.

Track listing

Disc one 
Introduction
Tabetai Nametai Kiken Chitai / Wanna Eat, Lick Your Danger Zone
Fami-res Bomber / Family Restaurant Bomber
Japan
Pheromone
Onigunsow
A Siren
Akumano Kenshin / Devilish Incarnation
Sokoni Anataga / There You Are
Iron Cross
S.H.R. -Sexy Hero Revolution-

Disc two 
Gyakufuu / Against the Wind
Good Vibrations
Burn
Sakurajima
Fire
Mikan No Uta / The Orange Song
Scorpion Death Rock
German Power
Sex Machinegun

See also 
Sex Machineguns

2003 live albums
Sex Machineguns albums
Albums recorded at the Nippon Budokan